Laurent Pécheux (17 July 1729 – 1821 Turin) was a French-born painter, active in Rome and Northern Italy in a Neoclassical-style.

Biography
Born in Lyon, France, Pécheux  initially studied at the Jesuit College, but was sent to Paris where he frequented the studio of Charles-Joseph Natoire, Jean-Baptiste Pillement, and Jean-Antoine Morand. In 1751, the artists Gabriel-François Doyen and Augustin Pajou, winners of the Prix de Rome in 1748, convinced him to go to Rome. He obtained money from his father and arrived in 1753.

There, at the invitation of Nicolas Guibal, he frequented the studio of Anton Raphael Mengs. He also befriended Pompeo Batoni. He lived circa 1757 in the neighborhood of Trinità dei Monti, and there set up a teaching studio.

He was recruited in 1765 to paint a portrait of Princess Maria Luisa of Bourbon-Parma for the family of her fiancé, the Prince of Asturias, who would later become Charles IV of Spain. In 1777, Pécheux taught painting at the Accademia Albertina of Turin. He died in Turin. The pastellist Teresa Boccardi Nuytz was a pupil. He was also a tutor in Turin of the painter Giuseppe Monticone.

References

1729 births
1821 deaths
Artists from Lyon
18th-century French painters
French male painters
18th-century Italian painters
Italian male painters
19th-century Italian painters
Academic staff of Accademia Albertina
Italian neoclassical painters
French emigrants to Italy
19th-century Italian male artists
18th-century French male artists
18th-century Italian male artists